Castor Railway Station was a station serving the villages Castor and Ailsworth in Cambridgeshire. It was on the old London and North Western Railway Northampton to Peterborough line. On 3 January 1945 the station was badly damaged by a V1 attack. The station closed in 1957 but trains between Rugby and Peterborough East continued to run until the line itself closed in 1966. The line between Wansford and Peterborough has since been reopened as the Nene Valley Railway, although Castor station itself remains closed.

References

External links
 Castor station on navigable 1946 O. S. map
 Castor station on Subterranea Britannica

Disused railway stations in Cambridgeshire
Transport in Peterborough
Buildings and structures in Peterborough
Former London and North Western Railway stations
Railway stations in Great Britain opened in 1845
Railway stations in Great Britain closed in 1957
John William Livock buildings
1845 establishments in England
1957 disestablishments in England